Tmesisternus elegans is a species of beetle in the family Cerambycidae. It was described by Karl Borromaeus Maria Josef Heller in 1914.

References

elegans
Beetles described in 1914